The 1935 Digor earthquake occurred on 1 May at Digor, Kars in the Eastern Anatolia region of Turkey. It had a moment magnitude of 6.1 and caused 540 fatalities.

See also
 List of earthquakes in 1935
 List of earthquakes in Turkey

References

1935 in Turkey
1935 Digor
History of Kars Province
1935 earthquakes
May 1935 events